The Tri-Cities Otters are an amateur American soccer club based in Johnson City, Tennessee competing in the USL League Two.

History
Founded in 2016, the team represents the Tri-Cities Area communities in Northeast Tennessee and Southwest Virginia.

Stadium
The Otters play their home matches at TVA Credit Union Ballpark.

2021 Men's Roster

Year-by-year

References

USL League Two teams
2016 establishments in Tennessee
Association football clubs established in 2016
Soccer clubs in Tennessee
Johnson City, Tennessee